Dewanganj is a rural community (Gaunpalika) located in the Sunsari District of Province No. 1 of Nepal.

Geography 
It is about 5–6 km away from Bihar (India) and the nearest market for its people is in Phulkaha, India. Sunsari hosts 12 communities, 6 urban and 6 rural.

Demographics 
The population of the community numbers 39,367 as of the Census of Nepal 2021.

Administration 
Village development committees Madhyeharsahi, Dewanganj (VDC), Kaptanganj, Sahebganj and Ramganj Senuwari merged to form this local level body. Fulfilling the requirement of the new Constitution of Nepal 2015, Ministry of Federal Affairs and Local Development merged all VDCs and Communities into 753 new local level bodies (Communities).

The newly formed rural community is divided into 7 wards, with its headquarters at Dewanganj (VDC).

References

External links
 Official website
 Final District 1-75 Corrected Last for RAJPATRA

Rural municipalities in Koshi Province
Populated places in Sunsari District
Rural municipalities of Nepal established in 2017
Rural municipalities in Sunsari District